Le Cheylas is a commune in the Isère department in southeastern France.

Population

Twin towns — sister cities
Le Cheylas is twinned with:

  Pavarolo, Italy (1995)

See also
Communes of the Isère department

References

Communes of Isère